Svapnesvara Siva temple is in Gourinagar, Old Town, Bhubaneswar, the capital of Odisha,India. It is 200 m northeast of Purvesvara Siva temple. The temple is facing east. The 2 m2 sanctum is empty.

Physical description

Surroundings
The temple is surrounded by private residential buildings in south and west directions at a distance of 3 m. In the east are a road and a drain in the north. The temple faces east.

Architectural features (plan and elevation)
The temple stands on a high pista decorated with three mouldings measuring 50.80 m in length x 5.75 m in width with 0.92 m in height.

On plan, the temple is pancharatha with a square vimana and a frontal porch towards east. The vimana measures 4.65 square metres and porch 0.15 m width.

On elevation, temple is in rekha order with usual bada, gandi and mastaka measuring 10.00 m from pabhaga to mastaka. The bada of the temple measures 2.85 m in height with threefold division of trianga bada. Pabhaga has five mouldings measuring 0.70 m, plain jangha measuring 1.65 m and the baranda with five moulding measured 0.50 m in height. The gandi measures 5.10 m and is plain and devoid of ornamentation except at the base which is decorated with chaitya designs.

Raha niche and parsva devatas
The parsvadevata niches on the raha paga of the jangha on the three sides of north, west and south direction measure 0.75 m
in height x 0.45 m in width and 0.29 m in depth. They are empty and devoid of ornamentation.

Decorative features
Doorjambs: The doorjambs are recent additions installed during the renovation work and are without any carving.
Lintel: The lintel is a renovated one.

The building material used for the construction is light grey sandstone, and the construction technique is dry masonry.

The style is Kalingan. Originally the temple was constructed over a lofty pista with three mouldings.

State of preservation
Svapnesvara Siva temple was repaired by Orissa State Archaeology under the X and XI Finance Commission Award. Due to the recent renovation work, the temple is in a good state of preservation. It was totally renovated from pista to kalasa.

Threats to the property
Some of the conservation problems the temple is facing is that stagnation of drain water in the northern side of the platform will weaken the foundation in the long run.

See also
 List of temples in Bhubaneswar

References 

 Lesser Known Monuments of Bhubaneswar by Dr. Sadasiba Pradhan
 http://www.ignca.nic.in/asi_reports/orkhurda179.pdf

Hindu temples in Bhubaneswar